Jiangsu Gaochun High School is located in Gaochun, Nanjing, Jiangsu, China.

History

School motto 
 School Motto: "Purity, freedom" (Chinese: 纯，畅)
 Study Motto: "Study hard, think hard, ask more, act more" (Chinese: 勤学，善思，好问，进取)

References 

High schools in Nanjing